Kaneshiro Kōfuku (February 27, 1953 - December 29, 2002) was a sumo wrestler from Takanabe, Miyazaki, Japan. He made his professional debut in September 1969, and reached the top division in September 1974. His highest rank was sekiwake. He was a runner-up in two tournaments and earned two gold stars and three Fighting Spirit prizes. After retiring in 1987 he opened up a sumo-themed restaurant. He died of a heart attack in 2002.

Career
He was born in 1953, the same year as future top division stars Kitanoumi, Wakanohana II, Kirinji and Ōnishiki, and these five were often grouped together. He was active in judo and wrestling at high school,  and was introduced to the head coach of Kasugano stable, the former Tochinishiki, by an employee of TBS broadcasting. He made his professional debut in September 1969 (the same tournament as ) and reached jūryō in March 1973. He reached the top makuuchi division in September 1974 at the age of 21, and won his first special prize for Fighting Spirit in March 1977. He reached his highest rank of sekiwake in July 1977 but held it for only one tournament. He was ranked at komusubi on six occasions. After being runner-up in the January 1979 tournament and winning a second Fighting Spirit prize he changed his shikona or fighting name to Tochihikari, in honour of ōzeki Tochihikari Masayuki, who also fought for Kasugano stable. It was hoped that he could also reach the ōzeki rank. He was runner-up for the second time in May 1980, and won a third Fighting Spirit prize, but he had poor record against yokozuna. He had earned two kinboshi  by defeating Wajima in consecutive tournaments in November 1975 and January 1976, but was never able to defeat Kitanoumi, losing to him 29 straight times, which is a record for consecutive losses against the same opponent. He was also unable to beat Mienoumi, Wakanohana Kanji II, or Chiyonofuji when they were ranked at yokozuna, and his overall record was just two wins against yokozuna in 68 attempts. This was one of the reasons why he never became a sanyaku regular. Nevertheless, he had a steady record against lower ranked wrestlers, and few injuries, and was able to hold his own in makuuchi for ten years. His 60th and final top division tournament was in January 1985.  After falling back to the jūryō division, he was no longer considered worthy of the prestigious Tochihikari name and so reverted to Kaneshiro, his birth name.

Retirement from sumo
He retired in May 1987, to avoid falling to the makushita division. He left the sumo world upon retirement, as he had been unable to acquire elder stock in the Japan Sumo Association and remain as a coach. In addition to financial difficulty in securing the stock, the Sumo Association had also introduced a rule in 1976 requiring Japanese citizenship to become an elder, and Kaneshiro, because of his Korean parentage, was not eligible by birth and could not acquire citizenship until it was too late. He went into the restaurant business, opening a sumo themed restaurant named "Tochihikari" in Kasugai, Aichi and later opening branches in Osaka and Sendai, Miyagi. He died on December 29, 2002, at the age of 49, from a heart attack.

Fighting style
Kaneshiro had a flexible body and low centre of gravity with weight around his hips, and specialized in the underarm throw (shitatenage) and leg kicks such as ketaguri. His most common winning kimarite were yorikiri (force out) and oshidashi (push out).

Career record

See also
List of sumo tournament top division runners-up
Glossary of sumo terms
List of past sumo wrestlers
List of sekiwake

References

1953 births
Japanese sumo wrestlers
Japanese people of Korean descent
Sumo people from Miyazaki Prefecture
Sekiwake
2002 deaths
Sumo wrestlers who use their birth name